Blonde dans la Casbah is Biyouna's second album, released in January 2007. Its most prominent song is single Une Blonde Platine dans la Casbah, a song dedicated to Biyouna's mother, which has since gone to number one in several countries.

About the album

With Blonde dans la Casbah, produced by composer Joseph Racaille, the actress-singer's second album is a cabaret, served by arrangements with delicate inlays piano, violin and brass, guitar and mandolin. Galette sweets outdated Blonde dans la Casbah gives us to discover a Biyouna subscribes to the sixties of his first steps and his dreams still intact.
There are duets with singer Christophe ("La Man"), the Malawian jazz singer Malia ("Bismilah"), Didier Wampas ("Merci pour tout"), and covers of the classics made famous by El Hachemi Guerouabi ("El Barah"), and Kamel Messaoudi ("Echemaa"). Biyouna is by turns poignant ("Bismillahi", "La Man"), crazy ("Les Coyotes", "Merci pour tout"), and theatrical ("Demain tu te maries", "Merci pour tout"). With special mentions in particular "Ta'ali", a ballad by Mohamed el Kamel and Mohamed Iguerbouchène, two major figures of Algerian song between the two world wars. For "Tomorrow you get married" again, a pop hit of Patricia Carli in the sixties that Biyouna wished to cover. Special mention also for the mixes "Bismillahi", "La Man" and "Une Blonde Platine dans la Casbah," which gave its name to the album, a tribute to her mother and accomplice to the artist who died the year before the album at the age of 84. "Tsaabli ouetmili" is a tribute to Algerian singer Fadela Dzirya and "El Ghafel" a composition by Djamel Laroussi.

Concerts and singles
Born of a sudden idea by Olivier Gluzman - now Biyouna's agent having sought her out in Algiers - Blonde dans la Casbah was released October 17 by Naïve. With backing including poly-instrumentalist virtuoso Henri Agnel (guitars) and Mustapha Mataoui (piano), Biyouna gave the premiere in Paris on stage in a series of concerts at Le Divan du Monde. In 2007 Biyouna performed the tracks in concerts in Algeria, Belgium, Canada, France, Germany, Switzerland and the United Kingdom. In 2008 the songs were performed in North America, where Une Blonde Platine dans la Casbah, Ta'ali and Tsaabli ouetmili were well received.

Track listing
 "Ta'ali" – 4:36 - (تعالي) "come [my gazelle]" sung in Arabic, Mohamed Hamel/Mohamed Igerbouchene
 "Une Blonde Platine dans la Casbah" – 3:20 - sung in French, Jacques Duvall/Joseph Racaille
 "Demain tu te maries" – 4:25 - sung in French, song of Patricia Carli/Léo Missir
 "El Ghafel" – 2:55 - "the naive boy" sung in Arabic, Rabah Zerradine/Djamel Laroussi
 "Les coyotes" – 3:18 - sung in French, Jacques Duvall/Joseph Racaille
 "Tsaabli ouetmili" – 3:31 - sung in Arabic, traditional arranged by Joseph Racaille
 "Merci pour tout (c'que j'n'ai pas)" featuring Didier Wampas – 3:22 sung in French, Jacques Duvall/Joseph Racaille
 "Echemaa" - 5:46 (الشمعة) "the candle" sung in Arabic, song of Yacine Ouabed
 "Bismilah" duet with Malia – 5:38 "Elle s'est perdue... Bismilah! Dieu soit loué!" sung in French, Philippe Latger/Joseph Racaille
 "El Bareh" – 5:03 sung in Arabic, :fr:Mahboub Bati (1919-2000), famous as song of El Hachemi Guerouabi 
 "La man" with the participation of Christophe – 4:15 sung in French, Marie Möör/Christophe

Charts

References

External links
Biyouna
Biyouna Fnac

2006 albums
Biyouna albums
French-language albums
Warner Records albums